The following are the national records in athletics in Germany maintained by its national athletics federation, Deutscher Leichtathletik-Verband (DLV).

The lists do differ according to whether a German athlete started at the time of preparation of the relevant records for the Association of Germany (DLV) or the German Democratic Republic (DVfL).

In 2006 the DLV extended its list of records with a preamble:

"According to present evidence the following list includes some record holders suspected of having violated anti-doping rules during their sporting career. In addition, a part of the records was achieved with a basis of forced doping and doping in the form of bodily harm. (...) A deletion of such records is not possible for legal reasons."

In 2010 Gesine Walther had her name removed from the 4 × 400 m relay record, because it was by her own admission achieved by doping. She said she would "feel responsible should young athletes use drugs in an effort to try to beat this record."

Outdoor

Key to tables:

+ = en route to a longer distance

h = hand timing

Mx = mark was made in a mixed race/competition

OT = oversized track (> 200m in circumference)

Men

Women

Mixed

Indoor

Men

Women

Notes

References
General
German Athletics Records  26 February 2023 updated
Specific

External links
DLV web site 

German
records
Athletics
Athletics